Lunts is a Yiddish surname, a variant of Luntz. Notable people with the surname include:

 (1908–1997), World War II pilot, Jewish Hero of the Soviet Union
Daniil Lunts (1912–1977), KGB agent who ran the Serbski Institute for Forensic Psychiatry in Moscow
Lev Lunts (1901–1924),  Russian playwright, prose writer and critic